The Bridge 19-40 Canal Society is a Scottish waterway society and registered charity operating community boats on the Union Canal, with bases at Winchburgh and Drumshoreland, West Lothian.

History
The former B.U.C.H.A.N. Society, a canal society from Broxburn, decided at their 1999 AGM to extend the area covered by the society, and to change its name. The new "Bridge 19-40 Canal Society" was to operate between Bridge 19 (the first bridge in West Lothian) and Bridge 40 (at Philpstoun). The new name was also meant to convey its role as a bridge between several local communities along the Union Canal.

Activities
The society's aims include:                                                  
promotion of co-operation between all canal users                        
support for the sympathetic and sustainable development of the waterway and its environment                                        
provision of volunteering opportunities for all ages                  
protection of natural habitats of the canal                         
encouragement of leisure use by the community including people with disabilities.

Along with the Seagull Trust, the Linlithgow Union Canal Society, the Edinburgh Canal Society, Forth Canoe Club and other canal-based community groups and charities, Bridge 19-40 Canal Society has campaigned for the retention, renovation and re-use of the Scottish Lowland canals.

Bridge 19-40 regularly organises Water Safety trips for primary schools in West Lothian; their aim is to raise awareness among children about the potential dangers of water, and to discourage litter on the waterway.

Photo gallery

External links

Canal Society
The Society's own website

Forerunner of 19-40 Canal Society
Bridge 19-40 at the Broxburn Gala
West Lothian Council advertising Bridge 19-40's Santa boat trips
Low wattage lighting donated to NB Bluebell

Walks around Winchburgh
Walk description: Kirknewton to Winchburgh, West Lothian
Walk Description: Winchburgh to Linlithgow

See also
List of places in West Lothian
List of waterway societies in the United Kingdom

Waterways organisations in Scotland
Transport in West Lothian
Canals in Scotland
Charities based in Scotland
Clubs and societies in Scotland
Organisations based in West Lothian